Armillaria limonea is a species of mushroom in the family Physalacriaceae. This plant pathogenic species is one of three Armillaria that have been identified in New Zealand (the others are A. novae-zelandiae and A. hinnulea).

See also 
 List of Armillaria species

References 

limonea
Fungi described in 2001
Fungi of New Zealand
Fungal tree pathogens and diseases